Monte Vettore (from Latin Vector, "carrier", "leader") is a mountain of the Umbro-marchigiano Apennine Mountains in Italy. It is the highest peak of the Sibillini massif. It is located in Ascoli piceno, Marche, Italy.

Geography 
The southwestern side of Sibillini massif, including the Vettore peak, is in Sibillini Mountains National Park. Below the summit of Vettore lies a small glacial lake in a small enclosed valley between Redeemer Peak.

History 

The local medieval tradition was that the Apennine Sibyl, a mysterious prophetess not counted among the Sibyls of Classical Antiquity, was condemned by God to dwell in a mountain cavern and await Judgement Day, having rebelled at the news that she had not been chosen Mother of God, but that some humble Judaean virgin had been favored. The peak of Monte Vettore, surrounded by reddish cliffs was recognized as the crown of Regina Sibilla.

Less stringently Christian legend set her in an underworld paradise entered through a grotto in the mountains of Norcia. Nearby the magical lake is fed by water from the cavern. Whoever stayed longer than a year could no longer leave, but remained deathless and ageless, feasting in abundance, amid revelry and voluptuous delights.

In popular culture 
In Il Guerrin Meschino, written by Andrea da Barberino about 1410, the central episode of the sixth part (Canto V) contains the "prodigious adventures" of Guerrino with this enchantress, the "Fata" Alcina, whom he seeks out, against all advice. He locates her cavern in the mountains of central Italy with the aid of Macco, a speaking serpent. She shows him the delights and horrors of her cavern, where sinners have been changed to the appropriate animals, but where sin is the only path to the knowledge of his real parents that he seeks, and Guerrin has to flee.

The long informative captions in the maps of Ortelius' 16th-century atlas, Cartographia Neerlandica, offer some detail about this Apennine Sybil:

Locally the Sibilla was in some sense a beneficent fata whose retinue would descend from her mountain at times to teach the village girls all the secrets of spinning and weaving (see Weaving (mythology) for other European weaving goddesses), and perhaps to dance the saltarello with the best of the young men. But if they were not back in their mountain fastness by sunrise, they would be denied access and would become mere mortals. On one occasion, what with dancing and pleasure, the faterelle had not noticed the approach of dawn. Scrambling up the Vettore, their goatlike feet crushed the rock to fragments. They reached the safety of their grotto just before dawn, but the long slope of talus is still pointed out as the Path of the Fata.

See also
Monti Sibillini
Venusberg (mythology)
 List of Italian regions by highest point

Notes

External links
Cartographica Neerlandica: Text for Ortelius' map No. 137
Romance of Guerrin il Meschino, Part Six (abstract in modern Italian).
Parco Nazionale dei Monti Sibillini 
Cooperation Network for European Culture Ascoli Piceno. Casual reference to the Pontius Pilate connection.
Monique Bouquet and Françoise Morzadec, 2004. La Sibylle: Parole et représentation. Collection "Interférences".   (Rennes: Presses Universitaires de Rennes)  discusses Antoine de la Sale's Paradis de la Reine Sibylle.

Mountains of Marche
Mountains of Umbria
Textiles in folklore
Highest points of Italian regions
Two-thousanders of Italy
Mountains of the Apennines